Hyalymenus is a genus of broad-headed bugs in the family Alydidae. There are about 6 described species in Hyalymenus.

Species
 Hyalymenus dentatus (Fabricius, 1803)
 Hyalymenus longispinus Stål, 1870
 Hyalymenus notatus Torre-Bueno, 1939
 Hyalymenus potens Torre-Bueno, 1939
 Hyalymenus subinermis Van Duzee, 1923
 Hyalymenus tarsatus (Fabricius, 1803) (Texas bow-legged bug)

References

Further reading

 
 
 

Alydinae
Pentatomomorpha genera